Mesilla (also known as La Mesilla and Old Mesilla) is a town in Doña Ana County, New Mexico, United States. The population was 2,196 at the 2010 census. It is part of the Las Cruces Metropolitan Statistical Area.

During the Civil War, Mesilla briefly served as capital of the Confederate Territory of Arizona.

The Mesilla Plaza is a National Historic Landmark.

History 

The village of Mesilla was incorporated in 1848, after the Treaty of Guadalupe Hidalgo moved the U.S.–Mexico border south of the village of Doña Ana, placing it in the United States. A small group of citizens, unhappy at being part of the United States, decided to move south of the border. They settled in Mesilla at this time.

By 1850, Mesilla was an established colony. By this time, its people were under constant threat of attack from the Apache. By 1851, the attacks caused the United States to take action to protect its people just to the north of the border, in the Mesilla Valley. They did this by creating Fort Fillmore. As a result of the fort, the United States declared the Mesilla Valley region part of the United States. Mexico also claimed this strip of land, causing it to become known as "No Mans Land". This boundary dispute, which was officially caused by a map error, was resolved in 1853 with the Gadsden Purchase. Mesilla became a part of the United States, as well as the southern part of New Mexico and Arizona.

Two battles were fought at or in the town during the Civil War. Mesilla served as the capital of the Confederate Territory of Arizona in 1861–1862 and was known as the "hub", or main city for the entire region. Recaptured by the Volunteers of the California Column, it then became the headquarters of the Military District of Arizona until 1864.

During the "Wild West" era, Mesilla was known for its cantinas and festivals. The area attracted such figures as Billy the Kid, Pat Garrett and Pancho Villa. The village was also the crossroads of two major stagecoach, mail, and trade routes: the Butterfield Stagecoach and the Camino Real de Tierra Adentro. The village of Mesilla was the most important city of the region until 1881.

In 1881, the Santa Fe Railway was ready to build through the Gadsden Purchase region of the country. Mesilla was naturally seen as the city the railroad would run through. However, the people of Mesilla asked for too much money for the land rights, and a landowner in nearby Las Cruces, a much smaller village than Mesilla, stepped in and offered free land. The city of Mesilla has not grown much since, and Las Cruces has grown to a population of an estimated 101,000 people (2014)  and is currently the second largest city in New Mexico.

La Mesilla Historic District, which includes Mesilla Plaza, was declared a National Historic Landmark in 1961.

The Fountain Theatre, except for 12 years, has been in operation since the early 1900s.

In 2008, the Roman Catholic parish church of San Albino was raised to the status of minor basilica by the Holy See.

The gazebo in the center of the plaza was torn down and rebuilt due to unnoticed structural problems that made the gazebo unsafe. Demolition started in October 2013 and rebuilding ending in May 2014 for the annual "Cinco de Mayo" celebration.

Geography
Mesilla is located near the geographic center of Doña Ana County at  (32.272776, -106.800965). It is bordered to the northeast by the city of Las Cruces. The Rio Grande passes through the western part of the town.

Demographics

As of the census of 2000, there were 2,180 people, 892 households, and 595 families residing in the town. The racial makeup of the town was 74.0% White, 0.2% African American, 1.0% Native American, 0.2% Asian, 0.1% Pacific Islander, 20.7% from other races, and 3.8% from two or more races. Hispanic or Latino of any race were 52.2% of the population.

There were 892 households, out of which 26% had children under the age of 18 living with them, 54% were married couples living together, 9% had a female householder with no husband present, and 33% were non-families. 28% of all households were made up of individuals, and 9% had someone living alone who was 65 years of age or older. The average household size was 2.4 and the average family size was 3.0.

In the town, the population was spread out, with 22% under the age of 18, 8% from 18 to 24, 23% from 25 to 44, 29% from 45 to 64, and 17% who were 65 years of age or older. The median age was 43 years. For every 100 females, there were 90.9 males. For every 100 females age 18 and over, there were 90.7 males.

The median income for a household in the town was $42,275, and the median income for a family was $51,181. Males had a median income of $30,500 versus $25,000 for females. The per capita income for the town was $25,922. About 6% of families and 9% of the population were below the poverty line, including 7% of those under age 18 and 6% of those age 65 or over.

Education
Las Cruces Public Schools is the local school district.

The district operates Mesilla Elementary School, and Zia Middle School.

References

External links

 

Towns in Doña Ana County, New Mexico
Towns in New Mexico
Butterfield Overland Mail in New Mexico Territory
San Antonio–San Diego Mail Line
New Mexico in the American Civil War
Populated places established in 1848
1848 establishments in the United States
American frontier
Stagecoach stops in the United States
New Mexico populated places on the Rio Grande